Castiglione Chiavarese is a comune (municipality) in the Metropolitan City of Genoa in the Italian region Liguria, located about  southeast of Genoa.

Castiglione Chiavarese borders the following municipalities: Carro, Casarza Ligure, Deiva Marina, Maissana, Moneglia.

History
In ancient times the area of Castiglione probably marked the border between the Ligurian and the Etruscan cultures. the modern frazione of Velva was a Roman municipium during Trajan's reign.

The Val Petronio was colonized by Benedictine monks after the fall of the Western Roman Empire; later it became a possession of the Fieschi family who, in 1276, sold Castiglione to the Republic of Genoa. In 1747 the latter built here a series of fortifications against the Austrians. In 1815, after a short Napoleonic rule, it was acquired by the Kingdom of Sardinia-Piedmont, becoming part of the newly unified Kingdom of Italy in 1861.

Main sights
Church of Sant'Antonino martire (1143)
Conio Abbey (1664)
Roman bridges and roads

Transport
Castiglione Chiavarese is located across the SS523 State Road connecting it to Sestri Levante, which also houses the nearest railway station.

References

Sources

Cities and towns in Liguria